The 1920 Pacific Tigers football team represented the College of the Pacific—now known as the University of the Pacific—in Stockton, California as an independent during the 1920 college football season. Led by Paul McCoy in his first and only season as head coach, Pacific compiled a record of 1–2–1.

Schedule

References

Pacific
Pacific Tigers football seasons
Pacific Tigers football